Conor Clancy (born 1971 in Kilmaley, County Clare) is a former Irish sportsperson. He played hurling with his local club Kilmaley and with the Clare senior inter-county team from 1995 until 2002.

References

1972 births
Living people
Kilmaley hurlers
Clare inter-county hurlers
All-Ireland Senior Hurling Championship winners